Bryce Perkins (born December 20, 1996) is an American football quarterback who is a free agent. He played college football at Arizona State, Arizona Western, and Virginia before signing with the Los Angeles Rams as an undrafted free agent in 2020.

Early years
Perkins attended Chandler High School in Chandler, Arizona. As a senior, he led Chandler to their first state championship victory since 1949. During his high school career he passed for 5,332 yards with 70 touchdowns and had 26 rushing touchdowns. Perkins committed to Arizona State University to play college football.

College career

Arizona State (2015–2016) 
Perkins redshirted his first year at Arizona State in 2015 and missed 2016 due to a broken neck.

Arizona Western College (2017) 
He transferred to Arizona Western College in 2017. In his lone season there he passed for 1,311 yards and seven touchdowns and rushed for 353 yards and four touchdowns.

Virginia (2018–2019) 
In 2018, Perkins transferred to the University of Virginia. Prior to the season, he was named the team's starter. He started all 13 games and set the school record for total offense in a single season with 3,603 yards and 34 touchdowns. He completed 225 of 349 passes for 2,680 yards with 25 touchdowns, nine interceptions and rushed for 923 yards and nine touchdowns. Perkins returned to Virginia as the starting quarterback for the 2019 season. Perkins started all 14 games for Virginia in 2019 and finished the season with 319 completions out of 495 pass attempts (64.4%) for 3,540 passing yards, 22 touchdowns, and 12 interceptions. He also had 227 carries for 769 rushing yards (3.4 YPC) and 11 touchdowns.

Professional career

Perkins signed with the Los Angeles Rams as an undrafted free agent on April 25, 2020. He was waived by the team during final roster cuts on September 5, 2020, and signed to the practice squad the next day. He was elevated to the active roster on January 2 and January 15, 2021, for the team's week 17 and divisional playoff games against the Arizona Cardinals and Green Bay Packers, and reverted to the practice squad after each game. On January 18, 2021, Perkins signed a reserve/futures contract with the Rams. Perkins was among players who received a Super Bowl ring for the Rams victory over the Cincinnati Bengals in Super Bowl LVI. He made his NFL debut in 2022 filling in for Matthew Stafford in weeks 10–12 against the Arizona Cardinals, New Orleans Saints, and Kansas City Chiefs following injuries to Stafford and Wolford.

NFL career statistics

Personal life
His father, Bruce Perkins, played fullback at Arizona State and briefly in the NFL. His uncle, Don Perkins, played eight seasons as a running back with the Dallas Cowboys. His older brother, Paul Perkins, has also played in the NFL.

References

External links
Los Angeles Rams bio
Virginia Cavaliers bio

1996 births
Living people
People from Queen Creek, Arizona
Sportspeople from the Phoenix metropolitan area
Players of American football from Arizona
American football quarterbacks
Arizona State Sun Devils football players
Arizona Western Matadors football players
Virginia Cavaliers football players
Los Angeles Rams players
African-American players of American football
21st-century African-American sportspeople